Nesiophasma is a genus of very large stick insects within the order Phasmatodea and the tribe of Stephanacridini. Known species occur in Sulawesi, Selayar Island south of Sulawesi, Sangir Island, Lesser Sunda Islands (Romang Island), and New Guinea. The largest in the list of species is Nesiophasma giganteum, with females reaching a body length of 30 cm (12 inches).

Species
The Phasmida Species File lists:

 Nesiophasma giganteum Hennemann, Le Tirant & Purwanto, 2021
 Nesiophasma kuehni (Brunner von Wattenwyl, 1907)
 Nesiophasma oligarches (Günther, 1935)
 Nesiophasma plateni (Dohrn, 1910)
 Nesiophasma sananaense Hennemann, 2021
 Nesiophasma spinulosum (Brunner von Wattenwyl, 1907)
 Nesiophasma turbans (Brunner von Wattenwyl, 1907)
 Nesiophasma zanum Hennemann, 1999

References

 Hennemann, Frank. (2021). Stick insects of Sulawesi, Peleng and the Sula Islands, Indonesia—a review including checklists of species and descriptions of new taxa(Insecta: Phasmatodea). Zootaxa. 5073. 1-189. 10.11646/zootaxa.5073.1.1. 
 Hennemann, Frank. (2020). Megacraniinae-The Palm Stick Insects: A new subfamily of Old World Phasmatodea and a redefinition of Platycraninae Brunner v. Wattenwyl, 1893 (Phasmatodea: "Anareolatae"). Zootaxa. 4896. 151-179. 10.11646/zootaxa.4896.2.1.

External links
  Phasmida Species File: Nesiophasma

Phasmatodea genera
Phasmatodea of Asia
Phasmatidae